Érik Boisse (born 13 March 1980, in Clichy) is a French épée fencer. He is the son of Philippe Boisse.

Boisse won the gold medal in the épée team event at the 2004 Summer Olympics and the 2006 World Fencing Championships after beating Spain in the final. He accomplished this with his teammates Ulrich Robeiri, Gauthier Grumier, and Fabrice Jeannet.

Achievements
 2006 World Fencing Championships, team épée

References

External links
 
 
 
 
 

1980 births
Living people
French male épée fencers
Fencers at the 2004 Summer Olympics
Olympic fencers of France
Olympic gold medalists for France
Olympic medalists in fencing
Medalists at the 2004 Summer Olympics
ESCP Europe alumni
21st-century French people